Hosch is a surname. Notable people with the surname include:

Julie Hosch (born 1939), American politician
Larry Hosch (born 1977), American politician
Nicolas Hosch
Tanya Hosch, Australian activist
Vincent Hösch (born 1957), German sailor
Vivian Hösch (born 1991), visually impaired German biathlete and cross-country skier